The Juvenile Movement of Democratic Unity was the youth wing of a Portuguese democratic platform that opposed the dictatorship of António Oliveira Salazar, the Movement of Democratic Unity.

Personalities like Mário Soares, Mário Sacramento, Octávio Pato, Júlio Pomar or Salgado Zenha were members of the Central Committee of the Juvenile MUD.

References

20th century in Portugal
Portuguese Communist Party
Youth wings of political parties in Portugal